Yeo Sung-hae  (born 6 August 1987) is a South Korean footballer who plays as defender for Seongnam.

Club statistics

External links 
Sagan Tosu Official website 

1987 births
Living people
Association football defenders
South Korean footballers
South Korean expatriate footballers
J1 League players
J2 League players
K League 1 players
K League 2 players
Sagan Tosu players
Gyeongnam FC players
Gimcheon Sangmu FC players
Incheon United FC players
Yeo Sung-hae
Expatriate footballers in Japan
South Korean expatriate sportspeople in Japan
Expatriate footballers in Thailand
South Korean expatriate sportspeople in Thailand
Hanyang University alumni